Semyazino Airport  is an airport in Russia located 6 km west of Vladimir. It is a forestry commission and VVS Antonov An-26 base.

The base is home to the 33rd Independent Transport Composite Aviation Regiment which is part of the 6th Air and Air Defence Forces Army.

Airlines and destinations

References

External links
 Vladimir Airport official website 

Soviet Air Force bases
Russian Air Force bases
Airports built in the Soviet Union
Airports in Vladimir Oblast